ACCO Brands Corporation is an American multinational company and is one of the world's largest designers, manufacturers, and marketers of premium business, technology, academic, and consumer products.  It was created by the merger of ACCO World from Fortune Brands with General Binding Corporation (GBC).

History
In 1903, Fred J. Kline founded the Clipper Manufacturing Company (a maker of paper clips) in Long Island, New York. In 1910, the company became the American Clip Company, and first used the name "ACCO" as an initialism, which became the company's formal name in 1922. After many acquisitions, ACCO went public in 1983, and was acquired in 1987 by American Brands (later Fortune Brands).

In 1990, ACCO acquired Hetzel in Germany, a company selling stationery products. In 1992, ACCO UK was created from the integration of ACCO Europe and Rexel Ltd. ACCO UK is the UK's largest manufacturer of office products. In 2005, ACCO was spun off from Fortune Brands and, through the merger with the General Binding Corporation, ACCO Brands was formed.

In 2012, ACCO Brands completed a $860 million deal to combine with MeadWestvaco’s Consumer and Office Products business. The transaction added brands like Mead, Five Star, Trapper Keeper, AT-A-GLANCE, Cambridge, Day Runner, Hilroy, Tilibra and Grafons to ACCO Brands' product line.

ACCO acquired Esselte Group Holdings in 2017.

In March 2020, the company asked for Section 301 tariff relief for their Kensington laptop docking stations, which had 25% tariffs due to Trump's 2018 China–United States trade war. The company's relief application said sales had increased 200% and they were needed for healthcare workers.

ACCO acquired video game peripheral manufacturer PowerA in 2020.

See also
 
 Advanced Gravis Computer Technology
 Derwent Cumberland Pencil Company
 General Binding Corporation
 Kensington Security Slot
 Swingline

Notes

References

External links
 
ACCO Brands home.
Official Rexel Website

 
Companies listed on the New York Stock Exchange
Manufacturing companies established in 1903
Companies based in Lake County, Illinois
Office supply companies of the United States
Manufacturing companies based in Illinois
1980s initial public offerings